The following highways are numbered 445:

Canada
Manitoba Provincial Road 445
New Brunswick Route 445

Japan
 Japan National Route 445

United States
  Florida State Road 445
  County Road 445 (Hernando County, Florida)
  Indiana State Road 445
  Louisiana Highway 445
  Maryland Route 445
  Nevada State Route 445
  New Jersey Route 445 (unsigned designation for the Palisades Interstate Parkway)
 New Jersey Route 445S
  New Mexico State Road 445
  North Carolina Highway 445
  Pennsylvania Route 445
  Puerto Rico Highway 445
  South Carolina Highway 445 (former)
  Tennessee State Route 445
 Texas
  Texas State Highway Loop 445
  Farm to Market Road 445